The CA Identification Number, also "CA Number", is a number used to identify a person or a company who deals with textile products in Canada. The textile dealer uses the CA number on products in place of a name and a postal address. The Competition Bureau is responsible for allocating CA numbers.

The use of CA numbers is regulated by the Textile Labelling Act.

See also 
 Australian Company Number
 Registered identification number, used in the United States

References

External links
 Textile Labelling Act, Justice Laws website

Company identification numbers